Masazumi Chaya  is a Japanese American dancer, choreographer and the associate artistic director of Alvin Ailey American Dance Theater (AAADT).

Early life
Chaya was born and trained in classical ballet in Fukuoka, Japan, to a doctor and nurse. He found his way into theater as a dresser in his teenage years, and later as a musical theater dancer on stage and on television in Tokyo.

He moved to New York City in December 1970, after questioning whether he was getting work in Japan for being a male, instead of for his ability.

Career
Chaya performed with AAADT for fifteen years beginning in 1972, becoming rehearsal director after retiring from dancing in 1987 and also serving as choreographic assistant to Alvin Ailey before Ailey's death in 1989. Chaya was named AAADT's associate artistic director in 1991 by Judith Jamison.  From 1991 to 2019, Chaya served as Associate Artistic Director of the Company. 

Chaya has staged and re-staged various Ailey works, rehearsed dancers, and taught company class for AAADT. He primarily teaches Ailey dances that he has performed.

Chaya has focused on maintaining the spirit of Ailey's dances with today's performers, who have generally not experienced the same life challenges as Ailey's dancers of the past. He's credited with providing continuity to AAADT over the years. 

Former director Judith Jamison referred to him as the "miracle of this company," who "can remember details and dances like no other."

Ballet stagings
 Alvin Ailey's Flowers for the State Ballet of Missouri 1990 
 Alvin Ailey's The River for the Royal Swedish Ballet 1993, Ballet Florida 1995, National Ballet of Prague 1995, Pennsylvania Ballet 1996 and Colorado Ballet 1998

Ballet re-stagings
 The Mooche for AAADT
 The Stack-Up for AAADT
 Episodes for AAADT
 Bad Blood for AAADT
 Hidden Rites for AAADT
 Urban Folk Dance for AAADT
 Witness for AAADT
 The River for North Carolina Dance Theatre and Julio Bocca's Ballet Argentina
 Blues Suite for AADT
 Judith Jamison's Hymn for AADT

References

External links
 Masazumi Chaya, Celebrating 35 Years
 Masazumi Chaya, Associate Artistic Director, Alvin Ailey American Dance Theater
 Directors: Masazumi Chaya
 Masazumi Chaya in Alvin Ailey's dance production Revelations

1947 births
Living people
People from Fukuoka
Japanese emigrants to the United States
American dancers of Asian descent
Modern dancers